Qingtang wanzi is a traditional meatball soup found in Beijing cuisine.

Preparation
Traditionally, this dish includes the main ingredients:  of tenderloin,  of egg white, wood ear, oil, cooking wine, sesame oil, cilantro, green onion, and ginger.

The tenderloin, ginger and green onions are minced and made into balls by mixing with egg whites. The meatballs are boiled until they float to the surface and then taken out and served with coriander and sesame oil. Vegetables are served together with meatballs.

External links
Qingtang wanzi photo

Beijing cuisine
Meat dishes